Monongalia County, known locally as Mon County, is located in the U.S. state of West Virginia. As of the 2020 census, the population was 105,822, making it West Virginia's third-most populous county. Its county seat is at Morgantown. The county was founded in 1776. Monongalia County is included in the Morgantown, WV Metropolitan Statistical Area, and is the largest county in North-Central West Virginia. It is part of the Pittsburgh media market.

History

Monongalia County takes its name from the Monongahela River.  The name Monongalia may be a misspelling of Monongahela. Alternatively, the conventional Latinate ending "-ia" (designating "land of..." or "country of..." — as in Arabia, Bolivia or Colombia) may have been added to Monongahela (i.e., "Land of the Monongahela").

Monongalia County was formed in 1776 when Virginia's remote District of West Augusta was divided into three counties: Ohio, Yohogania and Monongalia, all named for their most prominent rivers. Ohio County then encompassed most of the western region of the district bordering the Ohio River, including parts of what is now southwestern Pennsylvania. Yohogania County consisted of much of what is now southwestern Pennsylvania and the present counties of Hancock and the northern part of Brooke in West Virginia. Monongalia County also encompassed what are now the counties of Tucker, Randolph, Harrison and Barbour in north-central West Virginia, as well as parts of what are now Washington, Greene and Fayette Counties in Pennsylvania. In 1780, in his Notes on the State of Virginia, Thomas Jefferson gave the militia enrollment of what was then the vast Monongalia County at 1,000 troops.

In 1863, West Virginia's counties were divided into civil townships, with the intention of encouraging local government.  This proved impractical in the heavily rural state, and in 1872 the townships were converted into magisterial districts.  Monongalia County was divided into seven districts: Battelle, Cass, Clay, Clinton, Grant, Morgan, and Union.  After a century of relative stability, in the 1970s Monongalia's seven historic magisterial districts were consolidated into three new Districts: Central, Eastern, and Western.

Geography

Adjacent counties
Fayette County, Pennsylvania (northeast)
Greene County, Pennsylvania (north)
Marion County (south)
Preston County (east)
Taylor County (southeast)
Wetzel County (west)

Major Highways

Rivers, streams, and lakes
Monongahela River
Cheat River
Deckers Creek
Cam Harker Spring
Cheat Lake
Dunkard Creek
Aarons Creek

Demographics

2020 census 
As of the 2020 census, there were 105,882 people and 42,710 households residing in the city. There were 49,881 housing units in Monongalia County. The racial makeup of the county was 85% White, 3.9% African American, 3.5% Asian, 0.2% Native American, 1.1% from other races, and 6.1% from two or more races. Hispanics or Latinos of any race were 3.1% of the population.

There were 42,710 households, of which  41% were married couples living together,  25.4% had a male householder with no spouse present,  25.3% had a female householder with no spouse present.The average household and family size was 3.06. The median age in the county was 33 years. The median income for a household in the county was $56,374.

2010 census 
As of the 2010 United States census, there were 96,189 people, 39,777 households, and 20,032 families living in the county. The racial makeup of the county was 91.0% white, 3.6% black or African American, 3.1% Asian, 0.2% American Indian, 0.4% from other races, and 1.8% from two or more races. Those of Hispanic or Latino origin made up 1.8% of the population. In terms of ancestry, 25.7% were German, 17.1% were Irish, 13.0% were English, 11.0% were Italian, 7.5% were American, and 5.0% were Polish.

Of the 39,777 households, 22.0% had children under the age of 18 living with them, 38.3% were married couples living together, 8.2% had a female householder with no husband present, 49.6% were non-families, and 31.7% of all households were made up of individuals. The average household size was 2.24 and the average family size was 2.87. The median age was 29.1 years.

The median income for a household in the county was $39,167 and the median income for a family was $62,966. Males had a median income of $43,383 versus $32,164 for females. The per capita income for the county was $23,116. About 8.6% of families and 21.0% of the population were below the poverty line, including 13.2% of those under age 18 and 7.6% of those age 65 or over.

2000 census 
As of the census of 2000, there were 81,866 people, 33,446 households, and 18,495 families living in the county.  The population density was 227 people per square mile (88/km2).  There were 36,695 housing units at an average density of 102 per square mile (39/km2).  The racial makeup of the county was 92.22% White, 3.38% Black or African American, 0.20% Native American, 2.45% Asian, 0.04% Pacific Islander, 0.32% from other races, and 1.39% from two or more races.  1.01% of the population were Hispanic or Latino of any race.

There were 33,446 households, out of which 24.20% had children under the age of 18 living with them, 43.80% were married couples living together, 8.30% had a female householder with no husband present, and 44.70% were non-families. 31.30% of all households were made up of individuals, and 8.40% had someone living alone who was 65 years of age or older.  The average household size was 2.28 and the average family size was 2.91.

In the county, the population was spread out, with 18.20% under the age of 18, 23.40% from 18 to 24, 27.70% from 25 to 44, 20.00% from 45 to 64, and 10.70% who were 65 years of age or older.  The median age was 30 years. For every 100 females, there were 101.80 males.  For every 100 females age 18 and over, there were 101.20 males.

The median income for a household in the county was $28,625, and the median income for a family was $43,628. Males had a median income of $33,113 versus $23,828 for females. The per capita income for the county was $17,106.  About 11.30% of families and 22.80% of the population were below the poverty line, including 17.90% of those under age 18 and 8.00% of those age 65 or over.

Government and politics
The county government consists of a county commission with three members. Currently, these members are: Thomas Bloom (D), Sean Sikora (R) and Jeffery Arnett (D).

In the 20th century, Monongalia County had been a bellwether for West Virginia, voting the same as the state in every election from 1916 to 2020, even as the candidate lost the national election, with the sole exception of 2008 when Barack Obama won the county and lost the state. While still typically favoring Republicans, the county tends to lean significantly more Democratic than the rest of West Virginia. Donald Trump carried the county with just over 500 more votes than Democrat Joe Biden in the 2020 presidential election, by far Biden's best county-level performance in the state.

Education
The county's public schools are operated by Monongalia County Schools.  The county is also home to West Virginia's largest university, West Virginia University, located in Morgantown.

Communities

Cities
Morgantown (county seat)
Westover

Towns
Blacksville
Granville
Star City

Magisterial districts
Central
Eastern
Western

Census-designated places
Brookhaven
Cassville
Cheat Lake
Pentress

Unincorporated communities

Arnettsville
Baker Ridge
Behler
Bertha Hill
Booth
Bowlby
Brewer Hill
Browns Chapel
Bula
Canyon
Cheat Neck
Chestnut Ridge
Clinton Furnace
Core
Crossroads
Crown
Daybrook
Dellslow
Delmar
Easton
Edna
Everettville
Fieldcrest
Flaggy Meadow
Fort Grand
Fort Martin
Georgetown
Greer
Greystone
Gum Spring
Hagans
Halleck
Harmony Grove
Hilderbrand
Hoard
Hog Eye
Holman
Hunting Hills
Jaco
Jakes Run
Jere
Kimberly
Klondike
Laurel Point
Little Falls
Lowsville
Macdale
Maidsville
Maple
McCurdyville
McMellin
Miracle Run
Mooresville
Morgan Heights
National
New Hill
Opekiska
Osage
Osgood
Pedlar
Pierpont
Pioneer Rocks
Price
Price Hill
Pursglove
Ragtown
Randall
Richard
Ridgedale
Ringgold
Rock Forge
Rosedale
Sabraton
Saint Cloud
Saint Leo
Sandy
Smithtown
Stewartstown
Suncrest Lake
Sunset Beach
Sturgisson
The Mileground
Triune
Tyrone
Uffington
Van Voorhis
Wadestown
Wana
West Sabraton
West Van Voorhis
Worley

See also
National Register of Historic Places listings in Monongalia County, West Virginia
Snake Hill Wildlife Management Area
West Virginia University
Murder of Skylar Neese

Other sources
Core, Earl Lemley, The Monongalia Story: A Bicentennial History, Vol. I: Prelude (1974), Parsons, W.Va.: McClain Printing Co.
Core, Earl Lemley, The Monongalia Story: A Bicentennial History, Vol. II: The Pioneers (1976), Parsons, W.Va.: McClain Printing Co.
Core, Earl Lemley, The Monongalia Story: A Bicentennial History, Vol. III: Discord (1979), Parsons, W.Va.: McClain Printing Co.
Core, Earl Lemley, The Monongalia Story: A Bicentennial History, Vol. IV: Industrialization (1984), Parsons, W.Va.: McClain Printing Co.
Core, Earl Lemley, The Monongalia Story: A Bicentennial History, Vol. V: Sophistication (1984), Parsons, W.Va.: McClain Printing Co.

References

External links
 
 Monongalia County History

 
1776 establishments in Virginia
Morgantown metropolitan area
Populated places established in 1776
Counties of Appalachia